Kuku Bra is the debut studio album by German rapper Capital Bra, at this time simply known as Capital. It was digitally released on 29 January 2016, through Baba City, Chapter One and distributed by the Universal Music Group. The album was promoted by four singles: "Bra macht die Uzi", "Kuku Habibi", "Fluchtwagen glänzen".

Background and singles
Vladislav Balovatsky (Capital Bra) started his career through Rap on Wednesday (Rap am Mittwoch), a German battle rap tournament. Following his win against Master Marv in February 2015, he departed from the tournament and started working on the album. In December, he released his first single, not included on the album "Bra", and announced the album. The album was announced in December of the same year, through the single "Bra macht die Uzi". Three more singles have been released; including "Kuku Habibi", "Fluchtwagen glänzen" and "Kreide", all three alongside German rapper King Khalil.

Track listing
Credits adapted from the booklet.

Charts

Release history

References

Capital Bra albums
2016 albums